The 1991 Cal State Hayward Pioneers football team represented California State University, Hayward—now known as California State University, East Bay—as a member of the Northern California Athletic Conference (NCAC) during the 1991 NCAA Division II football season. Led by 17th-year head coach Tim Tierney, Cal State Hayward compiled an overall record of 3–7 with a mark of 1–4 in conference play, placing last out of six teams in the NCAC. The team was outscored by its opponents 254 to 186 for the season. The Pioneers played home games at Pioneer Stadium in Hayward, California.

Schedule

References

Cal State Hayward
Cal State Hayward Pioneers football seasons
Cal State Hayward Pioneers football